Dadeng Subdistrict is an insular subdistrict in Kinmen County (Quemoy) in Taiwan. The islands and are also claimed by Communist China as part of Xiang'an District of Fujian.

History

From the Song Dynasty to the early Republican China period, the area was part of Xiangfeng Li.

In 1914,  the present-day Dadeng Subdistrict area became part of Xiamen's Siming County.

In 1915, the present-day Dadeng Subdistrict area became part of Kinmen County (Quemoy).

Japan occupied Kinmen County (Quemoy) during the Second Sino-Japanese War from 1937 to 1945. During this period, the county government was moved to Dadeng.

The islands have been under PRC control since October 9 or October 15, 1949 initially as part of Nan'an County. On the day of Qingming Festival in 2005, a monument to the more than 300 PLA soldiers who died during the struggle was erected on Dadeng Island.

In the lead-up to the Battle of Kuningtou in late October 1949, the PLA gathered forces in Aotou (in Xindian, Xiamen), Dadeng (Tateng) and Lianhe (Lienho) (then part of Nan'an County, now also in Xindian).

Dadeng District was established in 1949.

On September 3, 1954, fourteen 120mm and 155mm Chinese Communist artillery in Xiamen (Amoy) and Dadeng (Tateng) fired six thousand rounds at the Kinmen (Quemoy) Islands in a five-hour period. Two Americans of the US Military Assistance Advisory Group, Lieutenant Colonel Alfred Medendorp and Lieutenant Colonel Frank Lynn, were killed in the shelling. On the morning of September 5, three carriers, a cruiser and three destroyers from the United States Seventh Fleet were standing by, patrolling the Taiwan Strait (Formosa Strait) a few miles from Kinmen (Quemoy). On September 7, the Chinese Nationalists responded to the attack with a seventy-six plane air raid on coastal mainland targets, claiming to destroy five of fourteen Chinese Communist artillery pieces, with (ROC) damaged sustained to only three Nationalist planes or (PRC) six Nationalist planes downed and twenty-five damaged. Beijing (Peiping) reported at least sixty deaths as a result of Nationalist bombing. Taipei reported, "great fires at storage points, hundred of junks sunk, and blows at Communist troop concentrations".

In November 1955, a 6,300-foot causeway between Dadeng Island (Tateng Island) and the mainland was under construction by the PRC. On November 28, 1955, Chinese Nationalist 155mm howitzers fired 240 rounds at the causeway. Communist artillery responded with 680 rounds. No major damage was reported.

In the Second Taiwan Strait Crisis in 1958, Dadeng was one of the areas from which PLA forces shelled Kinmen County (Quemoy), Republic of China (Taiwan).

In 1958, Dadeng District became Dadeng Combat Zone Commune. During the Second Taiwan Strait Crisis in 1958, the islands were designated by the State Council of the People's Republic of China as the "Hero's Triangle".

In January 1971, Dadeng Combat Zone Commune (along with Xiaodeng and Liuhe) became a part of Tong'an County (later Tong'an District).

In 1984, Dadeng Combat Zone Commune became Dadeng Township.

In 1991, Dadeng Township became Dadeng Town.

In October 2002, the government of Dadeng Town was moved from Tianqian Village to Xitian.

At the end of 2002, Dadeng was designated a Taiwan Tourism Trade Zone.

In 2003, Dadeng Town became a part of Xiang'an District.

In September 2005, Dadeng Town became Dadeng Subdistrict.

In 2019, plans for a building an airport on Dadeng Island by 2020 involved doubling the size of the island.

Geography

Dadeng Subdistrict is made up of offshore islands and islets including:
Dadeng (Tateng, Twalin)
Xiaodeng (Hsiaoteng, Town I., Siao Deng)
Jiaoyu/Jiao Yu (Chiao I., Reef I. )
Baihajiao
Dadeng (大嶝/大嶝島), Xiaodeng (小嶝/小嶝島) and Jiaoyu (角嶼) were part of Kinmen County in Republican China and are claimed by modern Kinmen County, Republic of China (Taiwan). The islands have been under PRC control since October 9 or October 15, 1949.

Rock-filled waters make passage between the two areas difficult.

Administrative divisions
Dadeng Subdistrict administers nine residential communities:
Tianqian (T'ien-ch'ien), Shantou, Xunku, Dengqi, Shuanghu (Shuang-hu), Yangtang (Yang-t'ang), Beimen, Dongcheng, Xiaodeng (Hsiao-teng)

See also 
 List of islands of Fujian
 List of township-level divisions of Fujian

References

Subdistricts of the People's Republic of China
Township-level divisions of Fujian
Geography of Xiamen
Territorial disputes of China
Territorial disputes of the Republic of China
Islands of Fujian